Lamplugh is a civil parish in the Borough of Copeland, Cumbria, England.  It contains twelve listed buildings that are recorded in the National Heritage List for England.  Of these, one is listed at Grade II*, the middle of the three grades, and the others are at Grade II, the lowest grade.  The parish contains the village of Lamplugh, and is otherwise rural.  Most of the listed buildings are houses and associated structures, farms and farm buildings.  The other listed buildings comprise a church and a coffin rest.


Key

Buildings

References

Citations

Sources

Lists of listed buildings in Cumbria